The 1877 Ohio gubernatorial election was held on October 9, 1877. Democratic nominee Richard M. Bishop defeated Republican nominee William H. West with 48.94% of the vote.

General election

Candidates
Major party candidates
Richard M. Bishop, Democratic
William H. West, Republican 

Other candidates
Stephen Johnson, Independent
Lewis H. Bond, Greenback
Henry Adams Thompson, Prohibition

Results

References

1877
Ohio